Wansan-gu is a non-autonomous district in the City of Jeonju in North Jeolla Province, South Korea.

Administrative divisions 
Wansan-gu is divided into 18 neighbourhoods (dong).

See also 
 Deokjin-gu

References

External links 
  

Districts of Jeonju